Edward Studd (20 October 1878 – 2 March 1951) was an English cricketer. He played for Gloucestershire between 1917 and 1919.

References

1878 births
1951 deaths
English cricketers
Gloucestershire cricketers
Europeans cricketers
British people in colonial India